Jowitt's Dictionary of English Law is a comprehensive law dictionary covering the law of England and Wales, providing explanations of legal terms and their historical context.

The first edition (Dictionary of English Law) compiled by William Jowitt, 1st Earl Jowitt (1885–1957), was published posthumously in 1959, completed by Clifford Walsh.

The second edition was published in 1977, edited by John Burke.

The third edition, edited by Daniel Greenberg, was published in 2010.

The fourth edition, edited by Daniel Greenberg, was published in 2015.

See also
Bell's Dictionary and Digest of the Law of Scotland
Biographical Dictionary of the Common Law
Black's Law Dictionary
Bouvier's Law Dictionary
List of legal abbreviations
Stroud's Judicial Dictionary of Words and Phrases

References

External links
 Sweet & Maxwell

1959 non-fiction books
Law dictionaries